The 2008–09 Ekstraklasa was the 75th season of top-tier football in Poland. It began on 8 August 2008 and ended on 30 May 2009. The season was originally scheduled to start on 25 July 2008. However, the first two rounds of games were postponed because of legal uncertainties about the number of teams in the competition following an association-wide corruption scandal.

Wisła Kraków won the league for the second time in a row and for the 12th time in their history after defeating Śląsk Wrocław 2–0 in the final match of the season. Legia Warsaw finished as runners-up and qualified for the second qualifying round of 2009–10 UEFA Europa League. Lech Poznań finished third and qualified for the third qualifying round of the Europa League after winning the Polish Cup. Polonia Warsaw also managed to earn a spot in Europe by finishing fourth, thereby qualifying for the first qualifying round of the Europa League. Paweł Brożek of Wisła Kraków and Takesure Chinyama of Legia Warsaw finished as joint topscorers with 19 goals in the season.

On the bottom end of the table, relegation was once again subject to several non-competitive events. On competitive criteria, Górnik Zabrze and Cracovia would have been relegated to the I Liga, while Arka Gdynia would have had to compete in the relegation play-offs. However, ŁKS Łódź were denied a license for the 2009–10 season and thus were automatically relegated. The club appealed the decision without any success. Since ŁKS city rivals Widzew were also denied of promoting from the First League and appealed against this decision, thus creating uncertainties about the First League play-off participant, the Polish FA decided in June to postpone the relegation play-offs to an unknown date before eventually cancelling the matches completely. (see below).

Team changes from last season
Due to the corruption scandal several teams from last season have been punished with relegation. Those teams include Zagłębie Lubin, Korona Kielce and Zagłębie Sosnowiec. Lubin and Kielce were relegated to the First League while Sosnowiec were demoted an additional level to the Second League because they also finished the season in 16th and last place, a regular demotion spot. Widzew Łódź, who ended the season in 15th place, originally were going to be penalized as well. However, the club successfully appealed the decision in front of the Polish Olympic Committee, so they were assigned to the First League as a regularly demoted club.

Promotion to this year's Ekstraklasa was earned by Polish First League champions Lechia Gdańsk, runners-up Śląsk Wrocław, 3rd placed Piast Gliwice and 4th placed Arka Gdynia.

Dyskobolia Grodzisk Wielkopolski has been sold to an owner of First League club Polonia Warsaw. The two clubs merged, with Grodzisk's players and Ekstraklasa license transferred to Polonia. The merger concluded a series of negotiations between Grodzisk and other clubs. The initially planned merger with Śląsk Wrocław was eventually denied by the latter after several months of discussions. Grodzisk chairman Zbigniew Drzymała then started conversations with Pogoń Szczecin, which were quickly stopped without an agreement as well, before eventually coming to an agreement with Polonia.

Team overview

Stadia and locations

*Stadiums are under redevelopment

Personnel and sponsoring

League table

Results

Season statistics

Scoring
First goal of the season: Hernán Rengifo (Lech Poznań)  Match: 2-3 GKS Bełchatów, 47th minute  (8 August 2008)
Last goal of the season: Grzegorz Niciński (Arka Gdynia) Match: 2-1 Odra Wodzisław, 79th minute (30 May 2009)
Fastest goal in a match: Arkadiusz Aleksander (Odra Wodzisław) Match: 2-0 Legia Warsaw, 1st minute (17 August 2008)
First hat-trick of the season: Filip Ivanovski (Polonia Warsaw) Match: 3-0 Śląsk Wrocław, 21', 24', 67'.(29 August 2008);
Fastest hat-trick of the season: Rafał Boguski (Wisła Kraków) Match: 3-1 Odra Wodzisław, 52', 62', 77', 25 minutes. (5 December 2008)
Most goals scored by a player in one game: Daniel Mąka (Polonia Warsaw) Match: 4-0 Polonia Bytom, 64', 87', 89', 3 goals.(13 September 2008); 
Rafał Boguski (Wisła Kraków) Match: 3-1 Odra Wodzisław, 52', 62', 77', 3 goals. (5 December 2008)
Filip Ivanovski (Polonia Warsaw) Match: 3-0 Śląsk Wrocław, 21', 24', 67', 3 goals.(29 August 2008)
Marcin Komorowski (Polonia Bytom) Match: 4-1 Lechia Gdańsk, 9', 41', 69', 3 goals.(29 August 2008)
Widest winning margin: 8 teams tied Match: 4-0, 4 goals.
Most goals in a match: ŁKS Łódź Match: 4-3 Cracovia, 7 goals.(6 March 2009)

Team Records
Most wins: Wisła Kraków (19 wins)
Fewest wins: Cracovia, Arka Gdynia, Górnik Zabrze  (7 wins)
Most draws: Śląsk Wrocław (12 draws)
Fewest draws: GKS Bełchatów (3 draws)
Fewest losses: Lech Poznań (3 losses)
Most losses: Lechia Gdańsk (16 losses)
Most goals scored:Wisła Kraków (53 goals)
Fewest goals scored: Piast Gliwice (17 goals)
Most goals conceded: Polonia Bytom (46 goals)
Fewest goals conceded: Legia Warsaw (17 goals)

Top goalscorers

Relegation play-offs
The relegation play-offs were cancelled after a series of appeals over the question in which division both ŁKS Łódź and First League 2008–09 champions Widzew Łódź will play in the 2009-10 season. Originally, Arka Gdynia as 14th-placed team (sports court decisions excluded) of the Ekstraklasa and Korona Kielce as 3rd-placed team of the First League were scheduled to play in a two-legged play-off for a spot in Ekstraklasa 2009–10. However, the Polish FA were forced to postpone the series to an unknown later date due to the appeals and, after the issues could not be settled in time, eventually decided not to hold any matches.

References

External links

 Official site 

Ekstraklasa seasons
Poland
1